Eilon Solan (born 1969) is an Israeli mathematician and professor at the School of Mathematical Sciences of Tel Aviv University. His research focuses on game theory, stochastic processes, and measure theory.

Biography
Solan obtained a B.Sc. in mathematics and computer science from the Hebrew University of Jerusalem in 1989, and an M.Sc. in mathematics from Tel Aviv University in 1993. He completed his doctorate at the Hebrew University of Jerusalem in 1998 under the supervision of Abraham Neyman, with a dissertation on stochastic games.

Scientific career
Solan was one of the inventors of CAPTCHA in 1997, along with Eran Reshef and Gili Raanan.

Solan has 12 research papers joint with his son, Omri Nisan Solan. Some of these were published before Omri finished undergraduate studies.

References

External links
 

Date of birth missing (living people)
Game theorists
Hebrew University of Jerusalem alumni
Israeli mathematicians
Israeli statisticians
Living people
Tel Aviv University alumni
Academic staff of Tel Aviv University
1969 births